Joseph Thomas Breeden (born October 11, 1956) is a professional baseball coach, who worked in Major League Baseball.

Career
Breeden played minor league baseball in 1979 for the Calgary Expos of the Rookie-level Pioneer League, a Montreal Expos affiliate. In 1980, he played for the Rocky Mount Pines, an unafilliated team in the Class A Carolina League.

After retiring as a player, Breeden began to coach in high school and college baseball. He managed in the minor leagues. Breeden then coached the Florida Marlins and Toronto Blue Jays.

References

External links

1956 births
Living people
Baseball players from Norfolk, Virginia
Calgary Expos players
Florida Marlins coaches
High school baseball coaches in the United States
Major League Baseball bench coaches
Major League Baseball bullpen coaches
Minor league baseball managers
Old Dominion Monarchs baseball players
Rocky Mount Pines players
Toronto Blue Jays coaches
William & Mary Tribe baseball coaches